Baldwin W. Fullmer (May 6, 1834May 21, 1910) was a Canadian American immigrant, farmer, politician, newspaper editor, and Methodist minister.  He was a member of the Wisconsin State Assembly, representing Clark County during the 1893 session.

Biography

Fullmer was born in Bertie, Canada West. In 1845, Fullmer emigrated with his parents to the United States and settled in Illinois. In 1846, Fullmer and his parents moved to Dodge County, Wisconsin Territory. He went to the public schools He then went to Lawrence University and Baylin & Lincoln Commercial College in Milwaukee, Wisconsin. Fullmer joined the Methodist Conference and was ordained to the ministry. In 1876, Fullmer moved to Loyal, Clark County, Wisconsin. He was a farmer and taught school. Fullmer was also the editor of the Loyal Tribune newspaper. During the American Civil War, Fullmer served in the Union Army. He served as chairman of the Loyal Town Board and was a Republican. In 1893 and 1894, Fullmer served in the Wisconsin Assembly. In 1904, Fullmer moved to Webb Lake, Wisconsin. He died in Webb Lake, Wisconsin from diabetes.

References

External links

1834 births
1910 deaths
Pre-Confederation Canadian emigrants to the United States
People from Loyal, Wisconsin
People of Wisconsin in the American Civil War
Lawrence University alumni
Educators from Wisconsin
Farmers from Wisconsin
Editors of Wisconsin newspapers
American Methodist clergy
Mayors of places in Wisconsin
Republican Party members of the Wisconsin State Assembly
19th-century Methodists